AGD may refer to:
 AGD Interactive, a non-profit software company
 Academy of General Dentistry
Association for Genome Diagnostics
 Airgun Designs, a manufacturer of paintball equipment
 Agarabi language
 The Ambiguously Gay Duo, an animated television series
 Alpha Gamma Delta, a North American college women's fraternity
 Amoebic gill disease
 Anggi Airport, Indonesia
 Anogenital distance
 United States Army Adjutant General's Corps